MHE may refer to:

 Hereditary multiple exostoses
 Material-handling equipment
 Moving Horizon Estimation